Armour is a city in county seat of Douglas County, South Dakota, United States. The population was 698 at the 2020 census.

History
Armour was founded in 1885. The city was named after Philip Danforth Armour, who was the founder of Armour and Company, a meat packing company. Contrary to popular belief, Armour was never home to a meat packing plant; the town was so named because Mr. Armour was also the chairman of the railroad that went through Armour and donated a bell to the local congregational church. The athletic teams of Armour High School were formerly known as the "Packers" in reference to the well known packing company, although today the high school plays its sports jointly with Tripp-Delmont High School as the "Armour/Tripp-DelmontNighthawks."

Geography
Armour is located at  (43.319410, -98.347342).

Armour has been assigned the ZIP code 57313, and the FIPS place code 02260.

Demographics

2010 census
As of the census of 2010, there were 699 people, 325 households, and 181 families residing in the city. The racial makeup of the city was 95.7% White, 2.7% Native American, 0.3% Asian, and 1.3% from two or more races. Hispanic or Latino of any race were 0.6% of the population.

There were 325 households, of which 20.6% had children under the age of 18 living with them, 49.5% were married couples living together, 3.7% had a female householder with no husband present, 2.5% had a male householder with no wife present, and 44.3% were non-families. 41.5% of all households were made up of individuals, and 28% had someone living alone who was 65 years of age or older. The average household size was 2.02 and the average family size was 2.72.

The median age in the city was 52.4 years. 18.5% of residents were under the age of 18; 4% were between the ages of 18 and 24; 15.5% were from 25 to 44; 28.2% were from 45 to 64; and 33.8% were 65 years of age or older. The gender makeup of the city was 46.1% male and 53.9% female.

2000 census
As of the census of 2000, there were 782 people, 342 households, and 215 families residing in the city. The population density was 828.9 people per square mile (321.2/km2). There were 377 housing units at an average density of 399.6 per square mile (154.9/km2). The racial makeup of the city was 98.08% White, 0.77% Native American, 0.13% from other races, and 1.02% from two or more races. Hispanic or Latino of any race were 0.64% of the population.

There were 342 households, out of which 26.3% had children under the age of 18 living with them, 56.4% were married couples living together, 5.0% had a female householder with no husband present, and 37.1% were non-families. 35.7% of all households were made up of individuals, and 21.3% had someone living alone who was 65 years of age or older. The average household size was 2.16 and the average family size was 2.79.

In the city, the population was spread out, with 22.0% under the age of 18, 3.6% from 18 to 24, 21.4% from 25 to 44, 22.4% from 45 to 64, and 30.7% who were 65 years of age or older. The median age was 48 years. For every 100 females, there were 87.1 males. For every 100 females age 18 and over, there were 79.4 males.

The median income for a household in the city was $28,438, and the median income for a family was $41,797. Males had a median income of $27,500 versus $18,897 for females. The per capita income for the city was $15,829. About 8.8% of families and 12.6% of the population were below the poverty line, including 18.4% of those under age 18 and 12.4% of those age 65 or over.

Climate
This climatic region is typified by large seasonal temperature differences, with warm to hot (and often humid) summers and cold (sometimes severely cold) winters.  According to the Köppen Climate Classification system, Armour has a humid continental climate, abbreviated "Dfa" on climate maps.

Notable people
 Benjamin H. Adams, Rear Admiral and medical officer in the United States Navy
 Philip Danforth Armour
 Peirson M. Hall, federal judge born in Armour
 Edwin S. Johnson, United States Senator buried in Armour
 Emily St. James, née Todd Vanderwerff, critic-at-large at Vox, born in Armour

See also
 List of cities in South Dakota
 Armour population 2023

References

External links

 

Cities in South Dakota
Cities in Douglas County, South Dakota
County seats in South Dakota
Populated places established in 1885
1885 establishments in Dakota Territory
Armour family